Sioux City & Pacific Railroad Co. v. Stout, 84 U.S. (17 Wall.) 657 (1873), was a case decided by the Supreme Court of the United States that first enunciated the idea that a landowner could be liable for the injuries of a child trespasser.

Events
On March 29th, 1869, a small child was injured by a railroad turntable owned by Sioux City and Pacific Railroad, which was being operated in Blair, Nebraska. The child was playing on the turntable, which injured his/her foot. The father took the company to court in Nebraska, but it was removed to the Supreme Court.

Decision

A child was injured by a railroad turntable owned by Sioux City and Pacific Railroad, which was being operated in Blair, Nebraska. Sioux City & Pacific Railroad company was held liable, despite the prevailing idea that a landowner was not held liable for injuries to trespassers.  Trespassing children were thought to be a special case that required a higher duty of care.  This theory of liability came to be known as the "turntable doctrine" and later the attractive nuisance doctrine by the case Keffe v. Milwaukee & St. Paul R.R. Co.

See also
Chicago B. & Q.R. Co. v. Krayenbuhl: A similar case
List of United States Supreme Court cases, volume 84
Blair, Nebraska

External links

United States tort case law
United States Supreme Court cases
1873 in United States case law
Railway litigation in 1873
Chicago and North Western Railway
Child safety
Railway turntables
Negligence case law
United States Supreme Court cases of the Chase Court